Will Christopher Baer is an American author of hardboiled fiction.

Bibliography

Novels
Kiss Me, Judas (1999)
Penny Dreadful (2000)
Hell's Half Acre (2004)  
Godspeed (TBD)

Collections
Phineas Poe (2005), the trilogy consisting of Kiss Me, Judas, Penny Dreadful, and Hell's Half Acre

References

1966 births
Living people
20th-century American novelists
20th-century American male writers
Tulane University alumni
Naropa University alumni
Writers from California
21st-century American novelists
University of Memphis alumni
American male novelists
21st-century American male writers